The first season of the reality television series Prince Charming premiered on October 30, 2019, streaming on premium sector of RTL+ and began airing on television on April 20, 2020, on VOX. The first Prince Charming was 28-year-old account manager Nicolas Puschmann.

The season enden on December 18, 2019 (RTL+) and on June 8, 2020 (VOX), and Lars Tönsfeuerborn was initially named the winner. In the reunion, Puschmann and Tönsfeuerborn announced that they are still a couple and will move in together. In November 2020, both announced that they had split up. At the end of January 2021, Puschmann and Tönsfeuerborn confirmed that they were a couple again but would like to keep their relationship largely out of the public eye in the future. In September 2021 they separated again.

Filming
The first season of Prince Charming was shot in Greece in Crete in September 2019.

Contestants
This season was featured 20 contestants.

Contestant Progress

 The contestant went on a Group date with the Prince.
 The contestant went after the Group date, he went alone on a date with the Prince.
 The contestant stayed a night together with the Prince.
 The contestant quit the competition.
 The contestant had to give up his tie and was eliminated.
 The contestant was the runner up.
 The contestant won Prince Charming.

References

2019 German television seasons
2020 German television seasons